Thomea newtoni is a species of air-breathing land snail, a terrestrial gastropod mollusk in the family Achatinidae. This species is endemic to São Tomé and Príncipe.

References

 Global Names Index info

newtoni
Endemic fauna of São Tomé and Príncipe
Invertebrates of São Tomé and Príncipe
Gastropods described in 1894
Taxonomy articles created by Polbot